The 1915 Cleveland by-election was held on 9 December 1915.  The by-election was held due to the incumbent Liberal MP, Herbert Samuel, becoming Chancellor of the Duchy of Lancaster.  It was retained by Samuel.

References

1915 elections in the United Kingdom
1915 in England
20th century in North Yorkshire
December 1915 events
By-elections to the Parliament of the United Kingdom in North Yorkshire constituencies
Ministerial by-elections to the Parliament of the United Kingdom